Klychi is a rural locality (a village) in Zaboryinskoye Rural Settlement, Beryozovsky District, Perm Krai, Russia. The population was 180 as of 2010. There are 3 streets.

Geography 
It is located on the Shakva River, 5 km southwest of  Beryozovka (the district's administrative centre) by road. Shumkovo is the nearest rural locality.

References 

Rural localities in Beryozovsky District, Perm Krai